Bally Sports San Diego is an American regional sports network owned as a joint venture between Diamond Sports Group (itself a 50-50 joint venture between the Sinclair Broadcast Group and Entertainment Studios) (which owns a controlling 80% stake) and the San Diego Padres (which owns the remaining 20% stake), and operates as an affiliate of Bally Sports. It was launched on March 17, 2012.

The channel broadcasts local coverage of sports events within the San Diego  market. Bally Sports San Diego is available on cable providers throughout San Diego County, neighboring Imperial County, as well as the Palm Springs Area and Las Vegas Valleys, Southern Arizona and Hawaii; it is also available nationwide on satellite via DirecTV. Within the San Diego market, Cox Communications and Spectrum provide an alternate Spanish play-by-play feed during Padres games via a second audio program feed from the team's Spanish radio network.

History
The network was established after Fox Sports Networks reached a 20-year broadcast agreement for the regional cable television rights to carry games from the San Diego Padres Major League Baseball franchise, displacing previous rights holder 4SD, a local cable channel owned by Cox Communications. Henry S. Ford, an executive who previously ran operations at Fox's regional sports networks in Detroit and Ohio, was appointed as president and general manager of Fox Sports San Diego.

Fox Sports San Diego launched on March 17, 2012, with a San Diego Padres spring training game against the Kansas City Royals. The network started operations with a minimal presence and no dedicated editing facilities or studio; during its first season, Padres game broadcasts were produced from a high-definition production truck inherited from 4SD. Pre-game and post-game shows were also produced from the same truck, and broadcast from a semi-permanent stage in the "Park at the Park" area of Petco Park, using a set inspired by a similar staging used by Fox for major sports events televised nationally. Resources have been shared with other FSN outlets; editing facilities were initially based out of Los Angeles, and master control is co-located alongside Fox's other regional sports networks at a facility near Houston, Texas.

On December 14, 2017, as part of a merger between both companies, The Walt Disney Company announced plans to acquire all 22 regional Fox Sports networks from 21st Century Fox, including the company's 80% stake in Fox Sports San Diego. However, on June 27, 2018, the Justice Department ordered their divestment under antitrust grounds, citing Disney's ownership of ESPN. On May 3, 2019, Sinclair Broadcast Group and Entertainment Studios (through their joint venture, Diamond Holdings) bought Fox Sports Networks from The Walt Disney Company for $10.6 billion. The deal closed on August 22, 2019. On November 17, 2020, Sinclair announced an agreement with casino operator Bally's Corporation to serve as a new naming rights partner for the FSN channels. Sinclair announced the new Bally Sports branding for the channels on January 27, 2021.  On March 31, 2021, coinciding with the 2021 Major League Baseball season, Fox Sports San Diego was rebranded as Bally Sports San Diego, resulting in 18 other Regional Sports Networks renamed Bally Sports in their respective regions.

On March 14, 2023, Diamond Sports filed for Chapter 11 Bankruptcy.

Programming

San Diego Padres
The network was created as a result of the Padres and Fox Sports signing a 20-year broadcast deal, in which Fox would pay $28 million for rights in the first year and would likely escalate topping out at a potential $75 million in the final year of the contract. The commentary team of Dick Enberg and Mark Grant remained intact upon the move to the new network, as they are employed by the Padres themselves.

Other sports

Professional
In addition to the Padres, the channel airs telecasts of the AHL's San Diego Gulls and professional sports teams (with the exception of baseball) from the neighboring Los Angeles-Orange County market, including the NBA's Los Angeles Clippers, and the NHL's Anaheim Ducks & Los Angeles Kings, simulcasting those televised games by its sister networks Bally Sports SoCal and Bally Sports West (blacked out in Imperial County). Bally Sports San Diego also airs Arizona Coyotes games in Imperial County, simulcasting from its sister channel Bally Sports Arizona. Until the team folded in 2014, the network also carried simulcasts of MLS's Chivas USA games from Prime Ticket for the 2012 MLS Season.

College

Fox Sports San Diego has also been engaged in discussions with many of the area's college athletic programs including the University of San Diego, San Diego State University, University of California, San Diego, California State University, San Marcos and Point Loma Nazarene; and Los Angeles area universities including UCLA and the University of Southern California.

Liga MX
In May 2018, Fox Sports acquired the English-language rights to broadcast the home matches of Liga MX clubs C.F. Monterrey and Club Tijuana across the Fox Sports family of networks, the latter being located in neighboring Tijuana, Baja California, Mexico as well as having an established fan base in the San Diego area. The first match under this contract aired on July 21, 2018, with a match between Tijuana and Guadalajara which was also simulcast nationally on FS1 as well as other nearby Fox Sports regional networks.

Notable on-air staff

Current
 Jesse Agler – backup Padres play-by-play announcer; currently is the Padres play-by-play announcer for Padres Radio station 97.3 The Fan and former Padres Social Hour host (2014 to 2015)
 Andy Ashby – Padres Live guest analyst
 Steve Finley – Padres Live guest analyst
 Mark Grant – Padres color commentator
 Tony Gwynn Jr. – Padres Live guest analyst and Padres POV host
 Nick Hardwick - radio host for Fox Sports Radio station KLSD (1360 AM)
 Steve Hartman – radio host for Fox Sports Radio station KLSD (1360 AM)
 Annie Heilbrunn – backup Padres sideline reporter; former Padres Weekly host (2012) and backup Padres Social Hour host (2014 to 2015)
 Clay Hensley – Padres Live guest analyst 
 Trevor Hoffman – Padres Live guest analyst
 Mark Loretta – Padres Live guest analyst
 Don Orsillo – Padres play-by-play announcer
 Mike Pomeranz – Padres Live and Inside San Diego Sports host
 Judson Richards - radio host for Fox Sports Radio station KLSD (1360 AM)
 Bob Scanlan – Padres sideline reporter
 Mark Sweeney – Padres Live analyst and backup Padres color commentator

Former
 Julie Alexandria – Padres sideline reporter (2016)
 Kris Budden – Padres sideline reporter (2014 to 2015; now with ESPN)
 Kelly Crull – Padres Weekly host and backup Padres sideline reporter (2013; now anchor/reporter for NBC Sports Chicago)
 Dick Enberg – Padres play-by-play announcer and Cup of Coffee host (2012 to 2016; deceased)
 Tony Gwynn – Padres color commentator (2012 to 2013; deceased)
 Mike Janela – Padres Social Hour host (2016)
 Lisa Lane – Padres POV host and backup Padres sideline reporter (2018)
 Michelle Margaux – Padres POV host and backup Padres sideline reporter (2016 to 2017, later Tampa Bay Rays reporter for Fox Sports Sun, now Houston Astros reporter on AT&T SportsNet Southwest)
 Andy Masur – backup Padres play-by-play announcer (2012; now radio host on WGN in Chicago)
 Britt McHenry – Padres sideline reporter (2012; last for ESPN)
 Laura McKeeman – Padres sideline reporter, backup Padres Live host, and #SDLive co-host (2013; now host/reporter for ESPN)
 Megan Olivi – Padres POV host and Padres social media correspondent (2013; now ESPN and UFC host/correspondent/reporter)
 Kate Osborne – Padres POV host and backup Padres sideline reporter (2014)
 Leila Rahimi – Padres sideline reporter (2012; now host/anchor/reporter for NBC Sports Chicago)
 Ally Sturm – Padres POV host and backup Padres sideline reporter (2015)

Availability
Cox Communications and DirecTV have carried the channel since its launch. Initially, DirecTV only carried Fox Sports San Diego as a part-time feed for live game broadcasts; it later added the dedicated, 24-hour feed on April 1, 2013. AT&T U-verse reached a carriage deal in September 2012, on the final day of the Padres regular season. Dish Network reached an agreement to carry Fox Sports San Diego on February 7, 2013, adding the channel to its lineup two months later on April 1.

Of the five major television providers serving the San Diego region, Time Warner Cable (which is now known as Spectrum that serves roughly 22% of the market) was a notable holdout in carrying the network on launch; by contrast, during the Padres' later tenure with the channel, TWC did carry 4SD (which was also, by contrast, not offered by U-verse or on satellite providers, leading to complaints filed by AT&T to the Federal Communications Commission that eventually led to the removal of the "terrestrial loophole" in 2010). In March 2013, the San Diego City Council held a hearing approving a symbolic resolution pressuring Fox and Time Warner Cable to reach a deal by the opening of the 2013 season, citing "the importance of professional baseball in San Diego." On February 10, 2014, Fox announced that they had finally reached an agreement with TWC to carry Fox Sports San Diego; the provider began carrying the channel on March 30, 2014, in time for the 2014 season.

In 2015, Frontier FiOS agreed to carry Fox Sports San Diego for the Coachella Valley in time for the 2015 season.

The only cable TV providers that haven't carried Bally Sports San Diego since its launch in 2012 are CenturyLink Prism TV in the Las Vegas Valley and Hawaiian Telcom in Hawaii.

References

External links
 

Fox Sports Networks
Television stations in San Diego
Television channels and stations established in 2012
2012 establishments in California
American companies established in 2012
Companies that filed for Chapter 11 bankruptcy in 2023
Bally Sports